The Time of Our Singing (2003) is a novel by American writer Richard Powers. It tells the story of two brothers, Jonah and Joseph Strom, involved in music, dealing heavily with issues of prejudice.
Their parents, David Strom and Delia Daley, met at Marian Anderson's concert on the steps of the Lincoln Memorial after she had been barred from any other legitimate concert venue.
The story goes back and forth between the generations, describing the unusual coupling of a German-Jewish physicist (David) who has lost his family in the Holocaust and a black woman from Philadelphia (Delia), both of whom have strong musical backgrounds.  They impart their love of music to their family. Their two boys go on to study music and become professional musicians: one a singer, the other a pianist. The parent's third child, their daughter Ruth, becomes a militant black activist.

This is a complex epic novel juxtaposing historical events throughout most of the 20th century, depicting racism and the development of civil rights efforts and the author's love and knowledge of music and physics. The book can be read on many levels, but those who have at least some familiarity with music will find a plethora of references to music of all eras and styles.

An opera was written based on the book by Kris Defoort. The opera premiered in La Monnaie in Brussels in September 2021.

Music referenced in the book
Powers makes many references to specific composers, musicians and singers in the novel.  Below are some examples.
 "Time Stands Still" by John Dowland (1563–1626)  - Page 4
 "Carmen" by Georges Bizet - Page 9
 Nina Simone
 Sarah Vaughan
 "Concierto de Aranjuez" by Joaquín Rodrigo
 "Sketches of Spain" by Miles Davis
 "Der Erlkönig" by Franz Schubert
 "Bist du bei mir" attributed to Johann Sebastian Bach, actually by Gottfried Heinrich Stölzel.
 The Visitation by Gunther Schuller
 "Sgt. Pepper's Lonely Hearts Club Band" by The Beatles
 "Yaller" by Cab Calloway
 "A Child of Our Time" by the British composer Michael Tippett

Physics referenced in the book
 General Relativity - Page 9
 Second Law of Thermodynamics - Page 88

Political references
 The Daughters of the American Revolution refused permission for Marian Anderson to sing to an integrated audience in Constitution Hall.
 Black Panther Party

Critical reception
The novel won the 2004 Ambassador Book Award for fiction, won the 2004 WH Smith Literary Award, and was a finalist for the National Book Critics Circle Award the year before.

References

External links

Bibliography of editions of The Time of Our Singing.
 The Chronicle of Higher Education Review of "The Time of Our Singing" in the context of artistic collaboration between Jewish & African American musicians.
 New York Times Review of "The Time of Our Singing".

2003 American novels

Novels by Richard Powers
Ambassador Book Award-winning works
Novels about racism
Novels about music
Novels adapted into operas